"On dirait" is a song performed by French-Israeli singer Amir Haddad. The song was released as a digital download on 29 August 2016 as the third single from his second studio album Au cœur de moi (2016). The song was written by Nazim Khaled and Jérôme Quériaud. The song has peaked at number 15 on the French Singles Chart, the song also charted in Belgium. It was certified gold by SNEP in February 2017. On 17 June 2017, the song won the Chanson de l'Année prize during the Fête de la Musique event in Nîmes.  Later that year, it won the NRJ Music Award for Francophone Song of the Year, Amir's second consecutive victory in that category having won the year before for "J'ai cherché".

Commercial performance
On 3 September 2016, the song entered the French Singles Chart at number 178, peaking at number 15 in January 2017. On 24 September 2016, the song entered the Belgian Walloon Singles Chart at number 48, peaking at number 14 in December 2016.

Music video
A music video to accompany the release of "On dirait" was first released onto YouTube on 5 September 2016 at a total length of three minutes and seventeen seconds.

Track listing

Charts

Weekly charts

Certifications

Release history

References

2015 songs
2016 singles
Amir Haddad songs
Songs written by Nazim Khaled